Cathal Cú-cen-máthair mac Cathaíl (died 665), often known as Cú-cen-máthair,  was an Irish King of Munster from around 661 until his death. He was a son of Cathal mac Áedo Flaind Chathrach (died c. 628) and belonged to the Glendamnach sept of the Eóganachta dynasty. The name Cú-cen-máthair means the "motherless hound".

Cú-cen-máthair succeeded Máenach mac Fíngin of the Eóganacht Chaisil, the Cashel branch of the kindred. A surviving poem attributed to Luccrech moccu Chérai contains a list of his ancestors back to Adam.

Cú-cen-máthair died in 665 of a plague which killed many others as recorded in the Irish annals. The king lists have him followed as King of Munster by Colgú mac Faílbe Flaind of the Eóganacht Chaisil. Cú-cen-máthair left at least two sons, Finguine mac Cathail (died 696) and Ailill mac Cathail (died 701), both of whom are listed as Kings of Munster in the annals.

References
 Byrne, Francis John, Irish Kings and High-Kings. Batsford, London, 1973.

External links
CELT: Corpus of Electronic Texts at University College Cork The Corpus of Electronic Texts includes the Annals of Ulster and the Four Masters, the Chronicon Scotorum and the Book of Leinster as well as Genealogies, and various Saints' Lives. Most are translated into English, or translations are in progress.
 A Poem on the Kings of the Eóganachta

665 deaths
Kings of Munster
7th-century Irish monarchs
Year of birth unknown